Events from the year 1778 in the United States.

Incumbents
President of the Second Continental Congress: Henry Laurens (until December 10), John Jay (starting December 10)

Events

January–March
 January 18 – The third Pacific expedition of Capt. James Cook, with ships HMS Resolution and HMS Discovery, first view O'ahu then Kaua'i in the Hawaiian Islands, which he names the Sandwich Islands.
 February 5 – South Carolina becomes the first state to ratify the Articles of Confederation.
 February 6 – American Revolutionary War: In Paris the Treaty of Alliance and the Treaty of Amity and Commerce are signed by the United States and France, signaling official recognition of the new republic.
 February 23 – American Revolutionary War: Friedrich Wilhelm von Steuben arrives at Valley Forge, Pennsylvania and begins to train the American troops.
March 18 – American Revolutionary War – Battle of Quinton's Bridge

April–June

 May 1 – American Revolutionary War – Battle of Crooked Billet 
May 17 – American Revolutionary War – Battle of Thomas Creek
May 20 – American Revolutionary War – Battle of Barren Hill
May 30 – Benedict Arnold signs U.S. oath of allegiance at Valley Forge.
 June 24 – A total solar eclipse takes place across parts of the U.S. from Texas to Virginia.
 June 28 – American Revolutionary War – Battle of Monmouth: George Washington's Continental Army battles the British general Sir Henry Clinton's army to a draw near Monmouth, New Jersey.

July–September

 July 3 – American Revolutionary War: the Battle of Wyoming, also known as the Wyoming Massacre, takes place near Wilkes-Barre, Pennsylvania, ending in a terrible defeat of the local colonists.
 July 4 – American Revolutionary War: George Rogers Clark takes Kaskaskia.
 July 27 – American Revolution – First Battle of Ushant: British and French fleets fight to a standoff.
 August 29 – American Revolutionary War: The Battle of Rhode Island takes place when the Continental Army attempts to retake Aquidneck Island from the British.
 September – The Massachusetts Banishment Act, providing punishment for Loyalists, is passed.
 September 17 – The Treaty of Fort Pitt is signed, the first formal treaty between the United States and a Native American tribe (the Lenape or Delaware).
 September 19 – The Continental Congress passes the first budget of the United States.

October–December

 October 6 – American Revolutionary War – Battle of Chestnut Neck
November 11 – American Revolutionary War: Cherry Valley massacre – British forces and their Iroquois allies attack a fort and the village of Cherry Valley, New York, killing 14 soldiers and 30 civilians.
 November 26 – In the Hawaiian Islands, Capt. James Cook becomes the first European to land on Maui.
 November 30 – American Revolutionary War: Continental Army in winter quarters at Middlebrook Cantonment, New Jersey.

Undated
 The first settlement is made in the area of what is now Louisville, Kentucky by 13 families under Colonel George Rogers Clark.
 Phillips Academy, a prestigious secondary boarding school in the United States, is founded by Samuel Phillips Jr.
 The term "thoroughbred" is first used in the United States in an advertisement in a Kentucky gazette to describe a New Jersey stallion called Pilgarlick.

Ongoing
 American Revolutionary War (1775–1783)
 Slavery in the United States

Births

 January 6 – Thomas Lincoln, farmer and father of the President of the United States Abraham Lincoln (died 1851)
 February 22 – Rembrandt Peale, artist and museum keeper (died 1860)
 April 11 – John Johnson, early leader in the Latter Day Saint movement in Ohio (died 1843)
 April 27 – Gideon Lee, politician (died 1841)
 May 3 – David Wilder, Jr., politician (died 1866)
 May 15 – Enoch Fenwick, Jesuit priest (died 1827)
 August 1 
 John Collins Warren, magazine founder (died 1856)
 Mary Jefferson Eppes, Thomas Jefferson's younger child (died 1804)
 August 2 
 Jabez Delano Hammond, politician (died 1855)
 Robert Richford Roberts, bishop (died 1843)
 August 3 – Jessup Nash Couch, politician (died 1821)
 August 4 – John Hunter, politician (died 1852)
 August 15 – John Tanner, early Mormon leader (died 1850)
 August 18 – Silas Condit, politician (died 1861)
 August 26 – John Adams, United States House of Representatives member (died 1854)
 August 27 – Mary Whitmer, Book of Mormon witness (died 1856)

Deaths

 June 12 – Philip Livingston, merchant and statesman from New York City (born 1716)
 November 11 – 30 people in the Cherry Valley massacre
 June 15 - William Henry Ferrell (born 1740) "killed by Indians in New Garden Settlement, Washington, Virginia, United States" Source: Ancestry.com

See also
Timeline of the American Revolution (1760–1789)

References

External links
 

 
1770s in the United States
United States
United States
Years of the 18th century in the United States